1956, Central Travancore (Malayalam: 1956) is a 2019 Malayalam-language period drama film written, directed and edited by Don Palathara and produced by Abhilash S. Kumar under Artbeat studios. The film stars Assif Yogi, Jain Andrews, Krishnan Balakrishnan and Kani Kusruti in lead roles. It features a musical score by Basil CJ. Cinematography was handled by Alex Joseph.

The film is Palathara's third feature-length movie, after Savam and Vith. The film was originally titled Kattupothu (Wild Buffalo). The film is shot in black and white, like most of Palathara's films. The film made its international premier at the Busan International Film Festival, in 2019. Then at the 42nd Moscow International Film Festival, on 5 October 2020.The film made its Indian premiere at the 25th International Film Festival of Kerala.  It won the 2020 John Abraham Award for Best Malayalam Film.

Plot
Set in 1956, the film takes place against the backdrop of the early migration to Ihad takenukki, before Kerala's land reforms take place. The film is set in the high ranges of Central Travancore, a vast landscape then largely uninhabited by humans. The main protagonists of the story are two brothers, Kora and Onan, from Kottayam, Kerala. They set out with a group of men to hunt gaur. The film portrays their journey.

Cast 

 Assif Yogi as Kora
 Jain Andrews as Onan
 Krishnan Balakrishnan as Karadikkela
 Kani Kusruti as Kela's wife
 Shaun Romy as Apparition
 Balu Sreedhar as Babu
 Kenshin (credited as Aamir) as Thommi
 Muraleedharan Raveendran as Devassya
 Pradeep Kumar as Thoma
 Reju Pillai as Vijayan
 Sameen Salim as Sojan
 Kurian George as Outhakkutty
 Joseph Chilamban as Avira
 Sherin Catherine as Performer
 Jicky Paul as Performer
 Jojo George as Doctor
 Byju Netto as Police sub inspector

Participation in film festivals 
In 2019, the film launched at the Busan International Film Festival in South Korea, and was also shown at the Film Bazaar Viewing Room Recommendations section, at the International Film Festival of India, held in Goa. 1956, Central Travancore also premiered at the Moscow International Film Festival in October 2020, in the non-competitive section. It is one of two Malayalam language films to be screened at the festival, the other being Biryaani, directed by Sajin Babu. The festival was postponed from April in the same year due to the worldwide COVID-19 pandemic. Due to the pandemic travel restrictions, the cast and crew will not be present at the festival, but there will a virtual interaction with the director after the screening. In an introduction to the film, Kirill Razlagov, the programming director of the festival, remarks that the film is evocative of the "deep-rooted spiritual connections between India and Russia."

Home media
The film was released on streaming platform MUBI.

References

2019 films
2019 drama films
2010s historical drama films
Indian historical drama films
2010s Malayalam-language films